Henry Frères may refer to:
 Paul Henry and Prosper Henry, French opticians and astronomers
 Henry Frères (crater), a lunar crater named after the above